The 1945 UK & Ireland Greyhound Racing Year was the 20th year of greyhound racing in the United Kingdom and Ireland.

Roll of honour

Summary
The Second World War came to an end in Europe on 8 May, leaving time for the industry to complete a full racing schedule. This included a return of the 1945 English Greyhound Derby that was won by Ballyhennessy Seal.

Attendances and totalisator turnover for NGRC tracks reached record highs, with over 50 million paying customers going through the turnstiles. It was also announced that the NGRC tracks had earned the government £120,000 for war charities during the duration. Annual totalisator turnover nearly doubled to 137,715,273 (a phenomenal sum in 1945).

The leading greyhound company, the Greyhound Racing Association (GRA) recorded a record profit of £1,616,000 but £1,230,000 of that was allocated for the liability of excess profit tax and National Defence Contribution. The annual report indicated that greyhound racing had served service and industrial workers with a form of relaxation and thereby creating a very substantial contribution to the war effort but warned that much improvement was required to its racetracks to replace damage from the past six years.

Other tracks reported even worse deductions with the Daily Herald reporting that Wandsworth Stadium Ltd (the company that owned the track) was subject to over 97% government tax deductions. Sidney Parkes the owner of the company revealed that gross profit was £430,000 of which £420,000 was taken by the government in various taxes leaving just £10,000 net profit. He stated "What a money making proposition dog racing is to the Labour government."

Tracks
Reg Perkins (a farming and transport businessman) and George Ellingworth (a garage owner) purchased Peterborough Greyhound Stadium and quickly began to improve facilities.

Competitions
In addition to the Derby, Ballyhennessy Seal won the Gold Collar at Catford Stadium after a seven length final victory, he also won his heat and semi-final by eight lengths. Nicknamed The Seal, he headed for the Laurels at Wimbledon Stadium and after progressing through the competition with ease, it was reported that he was suffering from rheumatism in his hind legs and he was not responding to treatment. He was withdrawn and retired to stud.

The Grand Prix held its first ever running in November 1945; the event at Walthamstow Stadium would eventually become a classic race. Derby finalist Magic Bohemian won the event for Leslie Reynolds and another Derby finalist Celtic Chief also made the final. Coventry trainer George McKay experienced success with Robeen Printer after winning the St Leger. The fawn bitch had arrived in England with a good reputation following a victory in the Irish Laurels and was bought for a record 1,650 guineas, for a bitch, by the Sanderson's, owners of Coventry stadium.

Earlier in the year at Eastville Stadium, during the final of the Golden Crest, Shannon Shore had won by ten lengths in a new World Record for 500 yards of 28.76 sec. The Welsh Derby was transferred from White City Stadium, Cardiff to Arms Park following the closure of the former in 1937.

News
Arthur 'Doc' Callanan died at aged 51  after suffering from ill health in Dublin; his legacy was closely linked to the success of Mick the Miller and a new competition was named in his memory at Harold's Cross Stadium, called the Callanan Cup. White City became the first track to install a photo finish camera. Magic Beau, a litter brother to the £2,500 acquisition Magic Bohemian, died in the Wembley kennels during December, the fawn and white dog had recently broken the Wembley 525 track record.

Ireland
Shaggy Lad, at odds of 1-10f won the Irish Puppy Derby final defeating Quare Times by 10 lengths. The fawn dog became the first greyhound to break 28 seconds at Harold's Cross when breaking the track record in the semi final by recording 27.96. He duly won the final in 27.98.

Principal UK races

Totalisator Returns

The totalisator returns declared to the licensing authorities for the year 1945 are listed below. Tracks that did not have a totalisator in operation are not listed.

Summary

References 

Greyhound racing in the United Kingdom
Greyhound racing in the Republic of Ireland
UK and Ireland Greyhound Racing Year
UK and Ireland Greyhound Racing Year
UK and Ireland Greyhound Racing Year
UK and Ireland Greyhound Racing Year